What This Country Needs is the sixth studio album by American country music artist Aaron Tippin, released on October 6, 1998. It was his first full studio album since switching from RCA Nashville to Lyric Street Records. The album includes three singles: "For You I Will", "I'm Leaving", and "Her", which respectively reached #6, #17, and #33 on the Billboard Hot Country Singles & Tracks (now Hot Country Songs) charts in 1999. The track "Sweetwater" was originally recorded by McBride & the Ride on their 1993 album Hurry Sundown, and by Greg Holland on his 1994 album Let Me Drive.

Track listing

Personnel
Amalgamated from liner notes
Eddie Bayers - drums, percussion
Dennis Burnside - piano, organ
Aubrey Haynie - fiddle, mandolin
Wes Hightower - background vocals (tracks 1, 3, 6, 7 & 9)
Steve Hill - background vocals (tracks 2 - 11)
Mike Johnson - steel guitar
Chris Leuzinger - electric guitar (tracks 1, 3 - 5, 7, 9 - 11), acoustic guitar (track 4)
Brent Mason - electric guitar (tracks 2, 4, 6 & 8)
Michael Rhodes - bass guitar (tracks 1, 3 - 5, 7, 9 - 11)
Aaron Tippin - lead vocals
Biff Watson - acoustic guitar (tracks 1 - 3, 5 - 11)
Glenn Worf - bass guitar (tracks 2, 6 & 8)
Curtis Young - background vocals (tracks 1, 2, 4 - 6, 8, 10 & 11)

Strings arranged by Dennis Burnside and performed by the Nashville String Machine. Contracted by Carl Gorodetzky.

Chart performance

Weekly charts

Year-end charts

References

1998 albums
Lyric Street Records albums
Aaron Tippin albums